Joʻmashoʻy is an urban-type settlement in Namangan Region, Uzbekistan. It is the administrative center of Mingbuloq District. The town population in 1989 was 9303 people.

References

Populated places in Namangan Region
Urban-type settlements in Uzbekistan